Stanislav Vidaković (born 14 October 1985) is a Croatian retired footballer who is known to have last played for Hougang United of the Singaporean S.League in 2012.Retired 2013.( Cruciate ligament rupture )

Career
Vidaković had a season in the Icelandic second tier.

Singapore
Despite earning a place in Goal.com's 2012 Round 6 S.League Team of the Week for his defensive performances countering Tampines Rovers, Vidaković was beleaguered by an eye infection through his tome there and had to take medicine.

References

External links
 

1985 births
Living people
Association football defenders
Croatian footballers
FK Olimpik players
Ungmennafélagið Fjölnir players
KF Laçi players
Hougang United FC players
1. deild karla players
Kategoria Superiore players
Singapore Premier League players
Croatian expatriate footballers
Expatriate footballers in Bosnia and Herzegovina
Croatian expatriate sportspeople in Bosnia and Herzegovina
Expatriate footballers in Iceland
Croatian expatriate sportspeople in Iceland
Expatriate footballers in Albania
Croatian expatriate sportspeople in Albania
Expatriate footballers in Singapore
Croatian expatriate sportspeople in Singapore